Chainlink is a decentralized blockchain oracle network built on Ethereum. The network is intended to be used to facilitate the transfer of tamper-proof data from off-chain sources to on-chain smart contracts.  Its creators claim it can be used to verify whether the parameters of a smart contract are met in a manner independent from any of the contract's stakeholders by connecting the contract directly to real-world data, events, payments, and other inputs.

History 

Chainlink was created in 2017 by Sergey Nazarov and Steve Ellis, who co-authored a white paper introducing the Chainlink protocol and network with Cornell University professor Ari Juels the same year. Chainlink acts as a "bridge" between a blockchain and off-chain environments. The network, which services smart contracts, was formally launched in 2019.

In 2018, Chainlink integrated Town Crier,  a trusted execution environment-based blockchain oracle that Juels also worked on. Town Crier connects the Ethereum blockchain with web sources that use HTTPS.

Chainlink's trademark was registered in the Cayman Islands on 2019-03-12, the corporation created being Smartcontract Chainlink Sezc, Ltd.

In 2020, Chainlink integrated DECO, a Cornell project co-created by Juels. DECO is described by its authors as a protocol that uses zero-knowledge proofs to allow users to prove information is true to a blockchain oracle without revealing sensitive information, such as birth dates.
Chainlink published a second white paper in April 2021. That paper, Chainlink 2.0: Next Steps in the Evolution of Decentralized Oracle Networks,  detailed a vision for expanding the role and capabilities of decentralized oracle networks to include hybrid smart contracts, which utilize on-chain code and off-chain services provided by oracle networks.

Technology 

Chainlink's decentralized oracle network is an open-source technology infrastructure that allows any blockchain to securely connect to off-chain data and computation resources. The network nodes fetch, validate, and deliver data from multiple sources onto blockchains to execute smart contracts.

In addition to the transfer of external information to a blockchain, Chainlink can also be used for several different off-chain computation functions, including a verifiable random function (VRF) and data feeds. The data feeds have been used to bring election data on-chain.

Chainlink's VRF can be used for random number generation which can be used in decentralized gaming. ZDNet reported the verifiability of the random number generation ensures the in-game results are tamper-proof.

Link token 
Node operators are compensated with the network's native cryptocurrency, LINK. Chainlink's LINK token is an ERC677 token, an extension of ERC-20. Tokens act as data payloads, feeding the required data from off-chain sources to smart contracts, which then act accordingly in response to the data provided by the token. According to Chainlink, the trade value derived from these tokens is used to pay node operators for retrieving data from smart contracts, and also for deposits placed by node operators as required by contract creators. Tokens can be stored in any ERC-20 wallet, as the ERC677 token retains all the functionality of an ERC-20 token.

References 

Cryptocurrencies
Ethereum
Ethereum tokens